Charaxes cithaeron, the blue-spotted emperor or blue-spotted charaxes, is a butterfly of the family Nymphalidae. It is found in south-east Africa.

Full description

The wingspan is 70–80 mm in males and 85–95 mm in females.
Ch. cithaeron Fldr. male: forewing above black with two transverse rows of blue spots; the proximal row in the middle, composed of 6 spots (2 in cellule lb and one each in 2-5), the distal consists of 8 spots, of which the first, in 6 and 7, are white; an elongate blue spot in la beyond the middle. Hindwing above beyond the middle with a broad transverse band, posteriorly whitish and anteriorly blue, blue submarginal spots and whitish marginal streaks. The basal part of the under surface with irregularly arranged, black, white-edged transverse streaks. The female has on the upperside a broad, curved white transverse band, proximally sharply defined, on the forewing and a bluish white transverse band on the hindwing and is hence very similar above to the female of violetta East Africa from Natal to Kenia in British East Africa. 

A full description is also given by Walter Rothschild and Karl Jordan (1900). Novitates Zoologicae Volume 7:287-524.  page 379-382 (for terms see Novitates Zoologicae Volume 5:545-601 )

Biology
Flight period is year-round. Larvae feed on Trema orientalis, Albizia adianthifolia, Celtis africana, Cola natalensis, Chaerachme aristata, Bafia racemosa, Afzelia quanzensis, Milletia sutherlandi, Maytenus senegalensis, and Craibia brevecaudatus. Notes on the biology of cithaeron are given by Pringle et al (1994), and  Kielland, J. (1990).

Habitat
Forested areas from the coastal belt to the Kenya Highlands.

Subspecies
Listed alphabetically.
C. c. cithaeron C. & R. Felder, 1859 (Tanzania, Mozambique, eastern Zimbabwe, South Africa, Eswatini)
C. c. joanae van Someren, 1964  (Zambia, northern Zimbabwe and possibly the Tukuyu District of Tanzania)
C. c. kennethi Poulton, 1926  (coast of Kenya, eastern Tanzania)
C. c. nairobicus van Son, 1953 (Kenya: central highlands east of the Rift Valley)
C. c. nyasae van Someren, 1964 (Malawi)

Taxonomy
Similar to Charaxes xiphares but the female has a much wider forewing white band. 
Also similar to Charaxes violetta, which has straight white lines on the underside
(these are irregular in Charaxes cithaeron)  Kielland discusses the great variability both within and between the various described subspecies and implies that the species is not divisible into definable subspecies.

Realm
Afrotropical

References

Seitz, A. Die Gross-Schmetterlinge der Erde 13: Die Afrikanischen Tagfalter. Plate XIII 31
Victor Gurney Logan Van Someren (1964). Revisional notes on African Charaxes (Lepidoptera: Nymphalidae). Part II. Bulletin of the British Museum (Natural History) (Entomology) 181-235.

External links
Charaxes cithaeron images at Charaxes page Consortium for the Barcode of Life subspecies and forms
Images of C.  cithaeron cithaeron Royal Museum for Central Africa (Albertine Rift Project)
Images of C.  cithaeron kennethi (Albertine Rift Project)
Images of C.  Cithaeron nairobicus (Albertine Rift Project)
African Butterfly Database Range map via search

cithaeron
Butterflies described in 1859